The 1952 United States Senate election in Delaware took place on November 4, 1952. Incumbent Republican U.S. Senator John J. Williams was re-elected to a second term in office over Democratic Lieutenant Governor Alexis I. du Pont Bayard, the son of former Senator Thomas F. Bayard, Jr. and descendant of two of Delaware's most powerful families, the du Ponts and the Bayards.

General election

Candidates
Alexis I. du Pont Bayard, Lieutenant Governor of Delaware (Democratic)
John J. Williams, incumbent U.S. Senator since 1947 (Republican)

Results
}

See also 
 1952 United States Senate elections

References

Delaware
1952
1952 Delaware elections